The Pompton River is a tributary of the Passaic River, approximately  long, in northern New Jersey in the United States.

It is formed south of the borough of Pompton Lakes by the confluence of the Ramapo and Pequannock rivers. It flows south, passing between Lincoln Park and Pequannock Township (to the west) and Wayne (to the east). It enters the Passaic north of Fairfield. Its watershed encompasses a section of the Ramapo Mountains along the New York-New Jersey border in the rural suburbs of New York City. It is the main tributary by volume of the Passaic. A portion of the river's water is diverted to the nearby Wanaque Reservoir.

Tributaries
 Pequannock River
 Ramapo River

See also
List of rivers of New Jersey
Pompton people

External links

 New Jersey Dept. of State: Photos of the Pompton River feeder of the Morris Canal
 U.S. Geological Survey: NJ stream gaging stations

Rivers of Essex County, New Jersey
Rivers of Passaic County, New Jersey
Ramapos
Rivers of New Jersey
Tributaries of the Passaic River